Arak or araq is a distilled Levantine spirit of the anise drinks family. It is translucent and unsweetened.

Traditional ingredients
Arak is traditionally made of only two ingredients, grapes and aniseed. Aniseeds are the seeds of the anise plant, and when crushed, their oil provides arak with a slight licorice taste.

Etymology 
The word arak comes from Arabic  (meaning 'perspiration').

Its pronunciation varies depending on local varieties of Arabic: , .  Arak is not to be confused with the similarly named liquor, arrack (which in some cases, such as in Indonesia—especially Bali—also goes by the name arak).  Another similar-sounding word is aragh, which in Armenia, Iran, Azerbaijan, Georgia and Iraq is the colloquial name of vodka, and not an aniseed-flavored drink.  Rakı, mastika, and ouzo are aniseed-flavored alcoholic drinks, related to arak, popular in Turkey, North Macedonia, Bulgaria, Cyprus and Greece respectively.

Related products include rakı, absinthe, ouzo, pastis, sambuca, and aragh sagi.

Consumption 
Arak is the traditional alcoholic beverage in Western Asia, especially in the Eastern Mediterranean countries of Iraq, Egypt, Syria, Lebanon, Israel, Palestine, and Jordan.

Arak is a stronger flavored liquor, and is usually mixed in proportions of approximately one part arak to two parts water in a traditional Eastern Mediterranean water vessel called an ibrik from Middle Persian or Parthian *ābrēq. The mixture is then poured into ice-filled cups, usually small, but can also be consumed in regular sized cups. This dilution causes the clear liquor to turn a translucent milky-white color; this is because anethole, the essential oil of anise, is soluble in alcohol but not in water. This results in an emulsion whose fine droplets scatter the light and turn the liquid translucent, a phenomenon known as louching. Arak is commonly served with mezza, which may include dozens of small traditional dishes. In general, arak drinkers prefer to consume it this way, rather than alone. It is also consumed with raw meat dishes (e.g. kibbeh nayyeh in Lebanon and çiğ köfte in Turkey) or barbecues, along with dishes flavored with toum (garlic sauce).

If ice is added to the drinking vessel before the water, the result is the formation of an aesthetically unpleasant layer on the surface of the drink, because the ice causes the oils to solidify. If water is added first, the ethanol causes the fat to emulsify, leading to the characteristic milky color. To avoid the precipitation of the anise (instead of an emulsion), drinkers prefer not to reuse a glass which has contained arak. In restaurants, when a bottle of arak is ordered, the waiter will usually bring a number of glasses for each drinker along with it for this reason.

Preparation 

Manufacturing begins with the vineyards, and quality grapevines are the key to making good arak. The vines should be very mature and usually of a golden color.  Instead of being irrigated, the vineyards are left to the care of the Mediterranean climate and make use of the natural rain and sun.  The grapes, which are harvested in late September and early October, are crushed and put in barrels together with the juice (in Arabic el romeli) and left to ferment for three weeks.  Occasionally the whole mix is stirred to release the CO2.

Numerous types of stills exist, most usually made of stainless steel or copper.  Pot and column stills are two types; which will affect the final taste and specificity of the arak.  The authentic copper stills with a Moorish shape are the most sought after.

The alcohol collected in the first distillation undergoes a second distillation, but this time it is mixed with aniseed.  The ratio of alcohol to aniseed may vary and it is one of the major factors in the quality of the final product.  The finished product is produced during a final distillation which takes place at the lowest possible temperature.  For a quality arak, the finished spirit is then aged in clay amphoras to allow the angel's share to evaporate.  The liquid remaining after this step is the most suitable for consumption.

Moonshine 

Arak made from various kinds of fruit based liqueurs as well as from wine is commonly produced as moonshine.

See also 

 Araqi, a Sudanese drink
 Zivania, a Cypriot drink

References

Sources and external links 

 History of Syria
 Wine and Dine e-magazine 
 Syrian homemade arak
 Video: preparing homemade arak near Tartous, Syria

Anise liqueurs and spirits
Distilled drinks
Arab cuisine
Levantine cuisine
Israeli cuisine
Syrian cuisine
Jordanian cuisine
Lebanese cuisine
Iraqi cuisine
Mediterranean cuisine
Adulteration
Iraq distilled drinks
Israeli alcoholic drinks
Syrian distilled drinks
Palestinian distilled drinks
Jordanian distilled drinks
Lebanese distilled drinks